John M. Drew (born May 31, 1973) is the current Tax Collector of Nassau County, Florida. He was first appointed Tax Collector by Governor Jeb Bush in May 2006. He was elected to the office later that year.

Drew oversees property tax collection, the Department of Highway Safety & Motor Vehicles, the Division of Driver Licenses, and the Florida Fish & Wildlife Commission. He has also volunteered with veterans' groups, education efforts, the arts and Micah's Place, the first Nassau County shelter for victims of domestic violence.

Background

Early life and family 
John M. Drew was born in Nassau County, Florida, to schoolteacher Mary Tom Drew and mill worker Joe Drew. John is married to Dr. Catherine Hardee Drew, PhD, clinical psychologist and C.E.O. of Florida Psychological Associates. They have one son, Joseph Drew. John and Joseph performed together in the musicals "Scrooge" and "Jesus Christ Superstar" at Amelia Musical Playhouse.

Education 
John M. Drew graduated from Fernandina Beach High School after founding the "Nassau County Teen-Age Republicans."

He holds B.A. and M.B.A. degrees from Jacksonville University, where he was baccalaureate speaker and was recognized with:

 "Scott Amos Alumni of Distinction" Award,  
 "Presidential Distinguished Service" Award 
 Order of the Green Key (Honorary Leadership Society) 
 Order of the Dolphin

In addition to serving on the Jacksonville University's Alumni Board of Governors, he was recognized as a Distinguished Alumnus. He was also the youngest-ever graduate of their E.M.B.A. program.

Career

Tax collector 
As tax collector, John M. Drew has won multiple Legacy Awards – a designation of excellence from the Florida Tax Collectors Association.  Nassau County was the first Tax Collector's Office to issue concealed weapons permit renewals. He also created a new program enabling Florida tax collectors to provide citizens with duplicate birth certificates – a program now in place across the state.

Public service 
In addition to his work as tax collector, John Drew also serves as:

 Chair of Legislative Policy (Gubernational Appointee): Northeast Florida Regional Council
 Member (and previous Chair), Nassau County's ADA Advisory Committee

Drew was President of the statewide Florida Tax Collector's Association, and served as:

 Chair, Legislative Committee
 Chair, Driver License Coalition
 Chair, Hunting & Fishing Coalition
 Chair, Education Committee
 Chair, Long Range and Strategic Planning Committee
 Participant, Kids Tag Art Program (which raised $1M for public schools)

On a national level, Drew is a member of the Legislative Committee of the National Association of County Collectors, Treasurers and Finance Officers, an affiliate of the only national organization that represents county governments in the United States.

Republican Party 
Drew was previously the Vice Chairman of the Nassau County Republican Party, and has served as its Precinct Committeeman since 2000.

Past affiliations include:

 President of the Nassau County Young Republicans 
Vice Chairman of the Nassau County Republican Party
 2000 Campaign Manager for Florida State Representative Aaron Bean 
 Executive Board Member, Nassau County Republican Party

Community service 
Drew helped to found Micah's Place, a facility in Nassau County for domestic violence victims who had nowhere to go until the creation of Micah's Place. He went on to serve seven years on their Board.

Drew serves on the board of the Nassau Education Foundation, which provides classroom grants to public schools and recognizes outstanding teachers and students.

He has also served as:

 President: Nassau Friends of Scouting  
 President: Nassau County Volunteer Center  
 Chairman: Amelia Island Montessori School Board of Directors  
 President: Fernandina Beach Optimist Club  
 1st Vice President: Fernandina Beach Shrine Club  
 Deacon: First Presbyterian Church of Fernandina Beach  
Volunteer: Amelia Musical Playhouse

Drew is the only Honorary Member of both the Fraternal Order of Police and the International Association of Fire Fighters in Nassau County.

References

1973 births
Living people
People from Nassau County, Florida
Tax collectors
Jacksonville University alumni